Louis Maurer (February 21, 1832 – July 19, 1932) was a German-born American lithographer, and the father of the American painter Alfred Henry Maurer. He was the last surviving artist known to have been employed by Currier and Ives. Prior to his death, Maurer was extensively interviewed about the firm by collector and connoisseur Harry T. Peters for his book Currier & Ives, Printmakers to the American People.

Maurer was born in Biebrich, Germany, and studied anatomy, mechanical drawing, and lithography in Mainz before immigrating to the United States in 1851. He began working as a lithographer at the firm of T.W. Strong in 1852. Later that same year he joined Currier and Ives, working there until 1860.  Maurer's series The Life of a Fireman (1854) was a popular lithography series produced for Currier and Ives. (These prints inspired sculptor John A. Wilson's Firemen's Memorial.)

During the American Civil War, Maurer worked as a shooting instructor in Palisades Park.  He was later a partner in the lithography firm of Heppenheimer & Maurer until his retirement in 1884.

Maurer began to study art in an academic setting at the age of fifty, first at the Gotham Art Academy and later at the National Academy under William Merritt Chase.

Maurer's archives are located at the American Antiquarian Society.

Gallery

References

External links

1832 births
1932 deaths
American centenarians
Men centenarians
German emigrants to the United States
American lithographers